Rashīd Aḥmad ibn Hidāyat Aḥmad Ayyūbī Anṣārī Gangohī (182611 August 1905) was an Indian Deobandi Islamic scholar, a leading figure of the Deobandi jurist and scholar of hadith, author of Fatawa-e-Rashidiya. His lineage reaches back to Abu Ayyub al-Ansari.

Along with Muhammad Qasim Nanautawi he was a pupil of Mamluk Ali Nanautawi. Both studied the books of hadith under Shah Abdul Ghani Mujaddidi and later became Sufi disciples of Haji Imdadullah. His lectures on Sahih al-Bukhari and Jami` at-Tirmidhi were recorded by his student Muhammad Yahya Kandhlawi, later edited, arranged, and commented on by Muhammad Zakariya Kandhlawi, and published as Lami` ad-Darari `ala Jami` al-Bukhari and al-Kawkab ad-Durri `ala Jami` at-Tirmidhi.

Name
In Tazkiratur Rashid his name and nasab is given as follows: Rashīd Aḥmad ibn Hidāyat Aḥmad ibn Qāẓī Pīr Bak͟hsh ibn Qāẓī G͟hulām Ḥasan ibn Qāẓī G͟hulām ‘Alī ibn Qāẓī ‘Alī Akbar ibn Qāẓī Muḥammad Aslam al-Anṣārī al-Ayyūbī. In the biographical work Nuzhat al-Khawatir he is mentioned with the nisbats "al-Anṣārī, al-Ḥanafī, ar-Rāmpūrī then al-Gangohī". In the introduction to al-Kawkab ad-Durri he is mentioned as "Mawlānā Abī Mas‘ūd Rashīd Aḥmad al-Anṣārī al-Ayyūbī al-Kankawhī al-Ḥanafī al-Jishtī an-Naqshbandī al-Qādirī as-Suhrawardī".

His given name was Rashid Ahmad; Abu Masud was his kunya. His heritage can be traced back to a famous companion of the Prophet Muhammad Sallallahu 'alaihi Wa Salam, namely Ayub Ansari RadiAllahu 'anhu (who died in 674). Ayub Ansari (RadiAllahu 'anhu) had hosted the Holy Prophet Sallallahu 'alaihi Wa Salam in his home in Medina city, when he made Hijrah (migration) to Medina city in 622.

Biography
Rashid Ahmad was born on Monday, 6 Dhu al-Qi'dah 1244 AH (1826 AD)  in Gangoh, Saharanpur District, British India (in present-day Uttar Pradesh, India). He was born in the mahallah of Sarai, close to the tomb of Abdul Quddus Gangohi. Both his father Maulana Hidayat Ahmad and his mother Karimun Nisa belonged to Ansari Ayyubi families, claiming descent from Abu Ayyub al-Ansari. His ancestral village was Rampur, but his grandfather Qazi Pir Bakhsh had settled in Gangoh.

Hidayat Ahmad was an Islamic scholar connected to the Waliullahi tradition, and in tasawwuf (Sufism) an authorized khalifah (successor) of Shah Ghulam Ali Mujaddidi Dihlawi. He died in 1252 AH (1836) at the age of 35, when Rashid was seven. A few years later Rashid's younger brother Sa'id Ahmad also died, at the age of nine.

After the death of Hidayat Ahmad the responsibility for Rashid's upbringing fell to his grandfather Qazi Pir Bakhsh. He also had four maternal uncles: Muhammad Naqi, Muhammad Taqi, Abdul Ghani, and Muhammad Shafi. He was especially close to Abdul Ghani, who took on a fatherly role for him. He also had a close friendship with his younger cousin, Abun Nasr, son of Abdul Ghani's.

Rashid Ahmad received his elementary education from a local teacher, Miyanji Qutb Bakhsh Gangohi. He read the Qur'an in Gangoh, probably at home with his mother. Then he studied the primary Persian books with his older brother Inayat Ahmad. He completed Persian studies in Karnal with his maternal uncle Muhammad Taqi, and also partly with Muhammad Ghaus. Afterwards he studied the primary books of Arabic grammar (sarf and nahw) with Muhammad Bakhsh Rampuri, on whose encouragement he then traveled to Delhi in pursuit of knowledge in 1261 AH (1845), at the age of 17.

After arriving in Delhi he studied Arabic with Qazi Ahmaduddin Punjabi Jehlami. Afterwards he attended the classes of different teachers before becoming a pupil of Mamluk Ali Nanautawi, a scholar of the Shah Waliullah line, and a professor at Delhi College. It was in this period that Rashid Ahmad met and developed a close companionship with Mamluk Ali's nephew, Muhammad Qasim Nanautawi. Both were private pupils of Mamluk Ali. After he completed his studies with Mamluk Ali, he stayed a few more years in Delhi to study under other teachers. He studied the books of hadith and tafsir under Shah Abdul Ghani Mujaddidi. Shah Ahmad Sa'id, the older brother of Shah Abdul Ghani Mujaddidi, was also among his teachers.

After four years in Delhi, Rashid returned home to Gangoh. He married Khadijah, daughter of his uncle Muhammad Naqi, at the age of 21. It was not until after his marriage that he memorized the Qur'an. He then travelled to Thana Bhawan, where he gave bay'ah (allegiance) at the hand of Haji Imdadullah in the Sufi path. He remained in Imdadullah's company and service for 42 days. When he prepared to leave for Gangoh, Imdadullah held his hand and gave him permission to take disciples.

While Nanautawi and Gangohi are often mentioned as co-founders of Darul Uloom Deoband, Rizvi writes that there is no historical evidence that Gangohi played a role in its establishment in 1283 AH. However, due to his close relationship with Nanautawi and others involved, it is unlikely that he was unaware of its founding. Rizvi cites a record of Gangohi's written inspection of the madrasah on 3 Rajab 1285 AH as the earliest evidence for his formal relationship with the madrasah. It was also common for graduates of the madrasah to attend Rashid Ahmad's hadith lectures in Gangoh.

Alongside Muhammad Qasim Nanautvi, Gangohi's efforts were instrumental in fostering a transnational, pan-Islamic consciousness in the subcontinent amongst the educated middle classes; during an era of increasing connectivity and arrival of new technologies of communication. He forbade Muslims from engaging in various customs which he regarded as stemming from Hindu culture and criticised those Muslims "who retained trappings of ‘Hindu’ culture and lifestyles"; whether in clothing or lifestyle. As a strong opponent of the British rule; Gangohi also fiercely denounced the singing of patriotic British songs in English schools; denouncing it as an act of Kufr (disbelief).

In 1297 AH, after the death of Qasim, Rashid was made sarparast (patron) of Darul Uloom Deoband. From 1314 AH he was also sarparast of the Darul Uloom's sister madrasah, Mazahir Uloom Saharanpur.

He died on a Friday, 8 Jumada II 1323 AH (1905 AD) after the call to prayer for the Friday prayer.

See also
 Muhammad Mian Mansoor Ansari
 Majid Ali Jaunpuri
 Hussain Ahmed Madani
 Al-Muhannad 'ala al-Mufannad

Notes

References

External links
 Books Collection

1826 births
1905 deaths
Hanafis
Maturidis
Deobandis
Hadith scholars
19th-century Muslim scholars of Islam
Indian Sunni Muslim scholars of Islam
Najjarite people
People from Saharanpur district